Tandy is a surname. Notable people with the surname include:

 Adam Tandy, British television producer
 Charles D. Tandy (1918–1978), chairman of Tandy Corporation
 David W. Tandy, American politician
 Donald Tandy (born 1918), British actor
 Ernest Tandy (1879–1953), English cricketer
 Geoffrey Tandy (1900—1969), British marine biologist and broadcaster, known for his work at Bletchley Park
 George Tandy, Jr., American singer-songwriter
 James Tandy (disambiguation), list of people with the name
 Jessica Tandy (1909–1994), American film actress
 Jeff Tandy (Born 1974), American musician
 Joe Tandy (1983–2009), British racing driver and team owner
 Karen Tandy, former head of the Drug Enforcement Administration
 Keith Tandy (born 1989), American football cornerback
 Mark Tandy (disambiguation), list of people with the name
 Meagan Tandy (born 1985), American actress and model
 Megan Tandy (born 1988), Canadian biathlete
 Nick Tandy (born 1984), British racecar driver
 Richard Tandy (born 1948), keyboardist for Electric Light Orchestra
 Russell H. Tandy (1891–1963), American illustrator
 Ryan Tandy (1981–2014), Australian rugby league footballer
 Sharon Tandy (born 1943), South African singer
 Steve Tandy (born 1980), Welsh rugby union player
 Steven Tandy (born 1952), Australian actor
 Vertner Woodson Tandy (1885–1949), one of the seven founders of Alpha Phi Alpha fraternity at Cornell University
 Vic Tandy (1955–2005), British lecturer

See also
 Tandy (disambiguation)